Johann Weyer or Johannes Wier ( or ; 1515 – 24 February 1588) was a Dutch physician, occultist and demonologist, disciple and follower of Heinrich Cornelius Agrippa.

He was among the first to publish against the persecution of witches.

Biography
Weyer was born in Grave, a small town in the Duchy of Brabant in the Habsburg Netherlands. He attended the Latin schools in 's-Hertogenbosch and Leuven and when he was about 14 years of age, he became a live-in student of Agrippa, in Antwerp. Agrippa had to leave Antwerp in 1532 and he and Weyer settled in Bonn, under the protection of prince-bishop Hermann von Wied. (Agrippa completed a work on demons in 1533 and perished two years later while on a trip to France). From 1534, Weyer studied medicine in Paris and later in Orléans, but it appears unlikely that he obtained the title of Doctor through these studies. Eventually, he practiced as a physician in his native Grave. Weyer was appointed city physician of Arnhem in 1545. In this capacity, he was asked for advice on witchcraft in a 1548 court case involving a fortune teller. In spite of a subsidy from emperor Charles V, the town of Arnhem was no longer able to pay Weyer's salary. Weyer moved to Cleves in 1550, where he became court doctor to duke William the Rich, through mediation by humanist Konrad Heresbach. Weyer published his major works on demons, magic, and witchcraft, in which he applied a skeptical medical view to reported wonders and supposed examples of magic or witchcraft. He retired from his post in 1578 and was succeeded by his son, Galenus Wier (1547-1619). After retirement he completed a medical work on a subject unrelated to witchcraft. He died on 24 February 1588 at the age of 73 in Tecklenburg, while visiting an individual who had fallen ill. He was buried in the local churchyard, which no longer exists.

Work and critical reception
Weyer's works include medical and moral works as well as his more famous critiques of magic and witchcraft:
  ('On the Illusions of the Demons and on Spells and Poisons'), 1563.
 , 1567, translated into German as:
 , 1580, ('A book of medical observations on rare, hitherto undescribed diseases')
  1577, (A book on witches together with a treatise on false fasting), translated into German as:
 ... 1586
  1577, ('On the disease of anger'), translated into German as:
  1585
 , 1564 ('On scurvy')
 , 1579. 1885 translation printed , Paris France. Two volume set.

In a time when witch trials and executions were just beginning to be common, he sought to derogate the law concerning witchcraft prosecution. He claimed that not only were examples of magic largely incredible but that the crime of witchcraft was literally impossible, so that anyone who confessed to the crime was likely to be suffering some mental disturbance (mainly melancholy, a very flexible category with many different symptoms).

Some scholars have said that Weyer intended to mock the concept of the hellish hierarchy that previous grimoires had established by writing those two books and entitling his catalogue of demons  ('The False Kingdom of the Demons').

Moreover, Weyer did not only write the catalogue of demons , but also gave their description and the conjurations to invoke them in the appropriate hour and in the name of God and the Trinity, not to create illusions but to oblige them to do the conjurer's will, as well as advice on how to avoid certain perils and tricks if the demon was reluctant to do what he was commanded or a liar. In addition, he wanted to abolish the prosecution of witches, and when speaking on those who invoke demons (which he called spirits) he carefully used the word exorcist.

Weyer never denied the existence of the Devil and a huge number of other demons of high and low order. There were many editions of his books (written in Latin), especially , and several adaptations in English, including Reginald Scot's "Discoverie of Witchcraft" (1584).

Weyer's appeal for clemency for those accused of the crime of witchcraft was opposed later in the sixteenth century by the Swiss physician Thomas Erastus, the French legal theorist Jean Bodin and King James VI of Scotland.

Tributes 

The Dutch human rights organization for health workers is named the Johannes Wier Foundation after him. Alongside his tutor, Heinrich Cornelius Agrippa, he appears as a character in the video game Amnesia: The Dark Descent.

Kurt Baschwitz, a pioneer in communication studies and mass psychology, dedicated most of the content of his first Dutch monography on witchcraft and witch trials  (1948) to the merits of Weyer. Later he extended this work to his German magnum opus,  which discussed methods of fighting attempts at mass delusion (1963).

Family
Dirk and Agnes Wier came from Zeeland and were closely acquainted with Maximiliaan van Egmond and Françoise de Lannoy, the future in-laws of William the Silent. Johan had two known siblings, Arnold Wier and the mystic Mathijs Wier (c.1520–c.1560). In Arnhem, he married Judith Wintgens, with whom he had at least five children. After Judith's death he married Henriette Holst. Johan's oldest son, Diederik Wier, became a jurist and diplomat, who in 1566-7, while employed by Willem IV van den Bergh, was involved in the "petitions of grievances about the suppression of heresy" by the Dutch nobility to Philip II of Spain, the rejection of which led to the Eighty Years' War.

Name
Weyer signed all his correspondence with "Johannes Wier" or occasionally with "Piscinarius". His parents and children carried the name "Wier" as well, and in 1884 his memorial in Germany was still named "" rather than "". Nevertheless, since the 20th century the name "Johann Weyer" has become standard in German and English-language scholarship. The use of "Weyer" may stem from Carl Binz's 1896 monograph "", who in 1885 had already given a lecture "", in which he, apparently unaware of Weyer's Zeeland origin, claimed that  and Wier was merely a  dialect pronunciation of Weyer.

See also
Nicholas Remy

Notes

Editions
De praestigiis Daemonum ... Libri V. Basel: Oporinus, 1563.
De praestigiis Daemonum ... Libri V. Basel: Oporinus, 1564.
De praestigiis Daemonum ... Libri V. Basel: Oporinus, 1566.
Medicarum observationum rararum Liber I. Basel: Oporinus, 1567
De lamiis liber. Basel: Oporinus, 1577.
De praestigiis Daemonum ... Libri 6. Basel: Ex Officina Oporiniana, 1577.
De Praestigiis Daemonum, & incantationibus ac veneficiis Libri sex, postrema editione sexta aucti & recogniti. Basel: Oporinus, 1583.
Opera Omnia. Amsterdam: Peter Vanden Berge, 1660.

Further reading 
 Kurt Baschwitz, De strijd met den duivel - de heksenprocessen in het licht der massa-psychologie, Amsterdam, 1948.
 Christopher Baxter, "Johann Weyer’s De Praestigiis Daemonum: Unsystematic Psychopathology," in The Damned Art: Essays in the Literature of Witchcraft, 53-75. London, 1977.
 Stuart Clark. Thinking with Demons: the Idea of Witchcraft in Early Modern Europe. Oxford: Oxford University Press, 1999.
 Jan Jacob Cobben. Jan Wier, devils, witches and magic, (translation by Sal A. Prins of Cobben's 1960 dissertation), Philadelphia: Dorrance 1976, .
 Jan Jacob Cobben. Duivelse bezetenheid, beschreven door dokter Johannes Wier, 1515-1588. Rotterdam: Erasmus Publishing, 2002. 
 Charles D. Gunnoe. "The Debate between Johann Weyer and Thomas Erastus on the Punishment of Witches." In Cultures of Communication from Reformation to Enlightenment: Constructing Publics in the Early Modern German Lands, ed. James Van Horn Melton, 257-285. Aldershot, England: Ashgate Press, 2002.
 Vera Hoorens, Een ketterse arts voor de heksen: Jan Wier (1515-1588), Bert Bakker Press, 2011, 
 Benjamin G. Kohl and Erik Midelfort. On Witchcraft. An Abridged Translation of Johann Weyer's De Praestigiis Daemonum. Ashville, 1998.
 
 H. C. Erik Midelfort. "Johann Weyer and Transformation of the Insanity Defense." In The German People and the Reformation, ed. R. Po-Chia Hsia, 234-61. Ithaca: Cornell, 1988.
 H. C. Erik Midelfort, A History of Madness in Sixteenth-Century Germany. Stanford University Press, 1998.
 George Mora, et al., Witches, Devils, and Doctors in the Renaissance: Johann Weyer, "De praestigiis daemonum". Medieval & Renaissance Texts & Studies  vol. 73, Binghamton, NY, 1991.
 Peter J. Swales, "Freud, Johann Weier, and the Status of Seduction: The Role of the Witch in the Conception of Fantasy," Sigmund Freud: Critical Assessments, London and New York: Routledge, Laurence Spurling, ed., vol. 1 (1989), pp. 331–358.
Peter J. Swales, "Freud, Krafft-Ebing, and the Witches: The Role of Krafft-Ebing in Freud's Flight into Fantasy," Sigmund Freud: Critical Assessments, London and New York: Routledge, Laurence Spurling, ed., vol. 1 (1989), pp. 359–365.
 Peter J. Swales, "A Fascination with Witches: Medieval tales of torture altered the course of psychoanalysis," The Sciences, vol. 22, no. 8 (November 1982), pp. 21–25.
 Michaela Valente. Johann Wier: agli albori della critica razionale dell'occulto e del demoniaco nell'Europa del Cinquecento. Florence: Leo S. Olschki, 2003.

External links 
To Prevent a "Shipwreck of Souls": Johann Weyer and "De Praestigiis Daemonum", an essay by Elisa Slattery
the Johannes Wier Foundation
Pseudomonarchia Daemonum
Witches, devils, and doctors in the Renaissance: Johann Weyer, `De praestigiis daemonum, Review by Peter Elmer, Medical History,' 1992 July; 36(3): p. 351
Vera Hoorens Intro to her "Biography Jan Wier", Groningen University, 2010

1515 births
1588 deaths
People from Grave, North Brabant
Dutch occultists
Demonologists
16th-century Dutch physicians
16th-century Dutch writers
16th-century occultists